Zeit zu leben (Time to Live) is an East German film. It was released in 1969. It was directed by Horst Seemann and written by Wolfgang Held and Horst Seemann.

External links
 

1969 films
East German films
1960s German-language films
1960s German films